Viktor Antonov (Виктор Антонов; born 1972) is a Bulgarian art director.

Biography 
Born in Sofia, Viktor Antonov moved to Paris at age 17.

Working for the cinema and video game industries, he became well known for his work as art director on Half-Life 2. He worked afterwards for Arkane Studios then became design supervisor for ZeniMax Media after the release of Dishonored.

Works

Filmography 

 The Prodigies (2011) as Production Designer
 Renaissance (2006)

Video games

References 

Science fiction artists
Bulgarian illustrators
Video game artists
Art directors
1972 births
Living people
Artists from Sofia
Artists from Paris